Wyatt Beazley Durrette III or just Wyatt Durrette is an American country music songwriter. He is known mainly as a collaborator of the Zac Brown Band, for whom he has written many of their singles.

Biography
Durrette was born in Virginia but moved to Atlanta, Georgia. His father was attorney and politician Wyatt Durrette. He wrote his first song at age eleven, and was inspired to pursue songwriting after being brought to a Jimmy Buffett concert by his sister, Dawn. Durrette briefly lived in Byron Center Michigan after his father took a job at the local school. After graduating college, Durrette worked as a bartender and manager of a bar in Atlanta, Georgia, where he met Zac Brown of the Zac Brown Band. He began writing songs with the band, and the two began writing songs together. Durrette is the co-writer of many of Zac Brown Band's singles, including their breakthrough "Chicken Fried".

Durrette also co-wrote Luke Combs' 2019 singles "Beautiful Crazy" and "Even Though I'm Leaving".

References

American country songwriters
American male songwriters
Songwriters from Georgia (U.S. state)
Living people
People from Atlanta
Year of birth missing (living people)